Denis Masinde Onyango (born 15 May 1985) is a Ugandan professional footballer who plays as a goalkeeper for South African Premier Soccer League club Mamelodi Sundowns.

Having begun his career in his native country, Onyango went on to play in the South African Premier Soccer League with Supersport United, Mpumalanga Black Aces, and Mamelodi Sundowns. With Mamelodi Sundowns, he won the 2016 CAF Champions League and took part in the 2016 FIFA Club World Cup. He was named the 2016 African-based African Player of the year. He was also ranked as the tenth best goalkeeper in the world in the list for 2016, compiled by the International Federation of Football History & Statistics.

He represented Uganda at the 2017 Africa Cup of Nations, and captained them until his international retirement in 2021.

Club career

Early career
Born in Kampala, Uganda, Onyango began his career with SC Villa in Kampala and later joined St. George SA in Ethiopia.

SuperSport United and Mpumalanga Black Aces
In 2006, Onyango joined South African Premier Soccer League side Supersport United.

On 8 July 2010, he was released by SuperSport United.

On 26 July, Mpumalanga Black Aces signed free agent Onyango.

Mamelodi Sundowns
In 2011, Onyango joined South African Premier Soccer League club Mamelodi Sundowns.

On 2 August 2013, he made a loan move to league rivals Bidvest Wits.

In July 2014 Mamelodi Sundowns exercised their option to extend Onyango's contract by a year.

Onyango won the PSL Goalkeeper of the Season award (best player in the South African top division) in the 2015–16 season and kept 14 clean sheets as Sundowns earned a record 71 points.

The Uganda Sports Press Associations voted Onyango as the best sports personality in the month of October 2016 in Uganda.

On 5 January 2017, he was voted the 2016 African-based African Player of the year at the CAF Awards held in Nigeria. The final tally saw him pick up 252 votes, compared to 228 votes for second place Khama Billiat.

International career
Onyango made his international debut for Uganda on 18 June 2005 World Cup qualifying match against Cape Verde. From then Onyango became a regular for the Cranes.

Onyango helped the Cranes qualify for the 2017 Africa Cup of Nations by conceding only two goals in six matches in their qualifying group. He made his first appearance at the Africa Cup of Nations in the 31st edition that was hosted by Gabon from 14 January 2017 to 5 February 2017.

He became captain of the national team in April 2017. On 12 April 2021, Onyango announced his international retirement, after Uganda failed to qualify for the 2021 Africa Cup of Nations.

Style of play
Onyango is renowned for his penalty-saving and his play in one-on-one situations. He is all round, very consistent and calm as described by Mark Anderson, a former Sundowns goalkeeper coach.

Career statistics

Honors
Super Sport United
 Premier Soccer League: 2007–08, 2008–09, 2009–10

Mamelodi Sundowns
Premier Soccer League: 2015–16, 2017–18, 2018–19, 2019–20, 2020–21, 2021–22
 Nedbank Cup: 2014–15, 2019–20,2021–22
 Telkom Knockout: 2015, Telkom Knockout: 2019
 CAF Champions League: 2016
 CAF Super Cup: 2017
 MTN 8: 2021

Individual
 2016 African-based African Player of the year: 2016

References

External links
Official Website of Supersport United Football Club
Premier Soccer League

Living people
1985 births
Sportspeople from Kampala
Association football goalkeepers
Ugandan footballers
Uganda international footballers
Ugandan expatriate footballers
SC Villa players
Saint George S.C. players
SuperSport United F.C. players
Expatriate soccer players in South Africa
Expatriate footballers in Ethiopia
Ugandan expatriate sportspeople in South Africa
Mamelodi Sundowns F.C. players
Luo people
2017 Africa Cup of Nations players
2019 Africa Cup of Nations players